(27 March 1903 - 17 May 1976) was a Japanese film director and film producer. Born in Kanagawa Prefecture, he attended Meiji University but left before graduating. He worked at the Zenshinza theater troupe before joining the Toho studio in 1937. He debuted as a director in 1940 and was known for a series of live action films starring the manga character Sazae-san. He also helped produce the Mito Komon series on television.

Filmography 
 1938: Producer of Makiba monogatari, "Tale of a Pasture"
 1943: World of Love (Ai no sekai: Yamaneko Tomi no hanashi)
 1956: Sazae-san
 1957: Ikiteiru koheiji
 1957: Sazae's Youth (Sazae-san no seishun)

References

External links
 

Japanese film directors
Japanese film producers
1903 births
1976 deaths